Zaouia El Abidia is a town and commune in Touggourt District, Touggourt Province, Algeria. According to the 2008 census it has a population of 19,993, up from 15,381 in 1998, and has an annual population growth rate of 2.7%. It forms the northern part of the urban area of Touggourt.

Localities
The commune is composed of only one locality:
Quartier de Zaouia El Abidia

References

Neighbouring towns and cities

Communes of Ouargla Province